A Life Model Decoy (frequently known by the abbreviation LMD) is a fictional android appearing in American comic books published by Marvel Comics. LMDs duplicate all outward aspects of a real living person with such authenticity that they can easily impersonate a specific person without casual detection. LMDs first appeared in "The Man For the Job!", a short story by writer Stan Lee and artist Jack Kirby that ran in the anthology book Strange Tales #135 (August 1965), in which the spy agency S.H.I.E.L.D. created LMDs of agent Nick Fury to use as decoys for an attack by the terrorist organization Hydra.

LMDs have been used in numerous Marvel Comics storylines in the half century since their first appearance, and have also been adapted into other media based on Marvel, including films, television series, animation and video games.

Publication history
Life Model Decoys first appeared in "The Man For the Job!", a short story by writer Stan Lee and artist Jack Kirby that ran in the anthology book Strange Tales #135 (August 1965). The spy agency S.H.I.E.L.D. created LMDs of agent Nick Fury to use as decoys for an attack by the terrorist organization Hydra.

A Life Model Decoy is a S.H.I.E.L.D.-designed robot that duplicates all outward aspects of a living person. The owner can see through, speak through, and control everything the Life Model Decoy does. Nick Fury's Life Model Decoys are probably the most common in the Marvel Universe.

It is designed to function as an exact body double for VIPs. Their design is such that they mimic the subject's outer appearance (i.e., fingerprints, hair, all details of the skin), speech patterns, scent, iris and retina patterns, body language, thought patterns (to fool telepaths), and any other biological indicators. Aside from any invasive procedure and vulnerability to strong electromagnetic pulse, they are indistinguishable from the original.

Powers and abilities
As an android, a Life-Model Decoy possesses all of the various superhuman attributes:
 Superhuman Strength – An LMD is super-strong and possesses strength beyond the human limit.
 Superhuman Speed – An LMD can run and move at speeds that are beyond human physical limits.
 Superhuman Durability – An LMD's construction makes them very durable.
 Superhuman Stamina – An LMD can exert itself well beyond a normal human's limit.
 Superhuman Agility – An LMD's agility, balance and coordination are enhanced to levels that are beyond natural human physical limits.
 Quick Repair – Nanites working within the LMD allow for self-repair similar to an enhanced Healing Factor.

Known examples
A number of Life Model Decoys with simple numerical designations have appeared in storylines. The following are listed in numerical order:

 281 – Appears in the 2011 "Fear Itself" storyline.
 361 – Appears in the 2011 Hulk storyline "Scorched Earth".
 391 – Appears in the 2011 "Fear Itself" storyline.
 399 – Appears in the 2011 "Fear Itself" storyline.
 442 – Appears in the 2011 Hulk storyline "Scorched Earth".
 737 – Appears in the 2011 Hulk storyline "Scorched Earth".

A number of Life Model Decoys have also been depicted impersonating specific characters. The following are listed in alphabetical order:

 Amber D’Alexis – The Life Model Decoy of the mother of Mikel Fury (aka Scorpio) appears in the 1994 graphic novel Wolverine/Nick Fury: Scorpio Rising.
 Annie – This female Life Model Decoy created and programmed by Bruce Banner in a 2011 Hulk storyline to assist Red Hulk between missions.
 Ant-Man III – In a 2010 Secret Avengers storyline, a villain named Father replaces Eric O'Grady, the third Ant-Man, with an LMD after O'Grady's death. This LMD later took on the identity of Black Ant.
 Black Panther - After Killmonger was resurrected by the Mandarin, he battled and appeared to have killed Black Panther, but it was later revealed that he had used an LMD to fake his death.
 Black Widow – An LMD of the former Russian agent appears in the 2011 "Fear Itself" storyline.
 Bucky – An LMD of Captain America's former partner appears in the 2011 "Fear Itself" storyline.
 Captain America – An LMD of the original Captain America, Steve Rogers, appears in a 1968 storyline in Captain America.
 Sharon Carter – An LMD of Captain America's ally, Sharon Carter, appears in a 1969 storyline in Captain America.
 Chuck – The Life Model Decoy who functions as the driver for Red Hulk and Annie is destroyed by Black Fog in a 2011 Hulk storyline.
 Deadpool – In the 2009 Hulk storyline "Code Red", the mercenary Deadpool is attacked by a number of Life Model Decoys made to resemble him.
 Dum Dum Dugan – The 2014 storyline "Original Sin" reveals that Nick Fury's long-time S.H.I.E.L.D. subordinate had been killed in 1966 from weapons fire ricochet and secretly replaced with an LMD that operated for many years without drawing suspicion from anyone, and which believes itself to be the genuine Dugan. The Dugan LMD appears in a 2015 storyline in Howling Commandos of S.H.I.E.L.D. and New Avengers where it was eventually revealed that the real Dugan was still alive, preserved via suspended animation, and that his mind had been beamed out to control the LMD bodies.
 Nick Fury – Numerous Life Model Decoys of Nick Fury are employed throughout his career. 
 Max Fury - One LMD of Nick Fury is an enhanced version that is stolen by Scorpio in a 1977 storyline, and later takes name "Max Fury" when recruited into the Shadow Council.
 Maria Hill – Maria Hill has used LMDs of herself as a tactical or hazardous situations that pose a danger to her life. During the 2008 storyline "Secret Invasion", S.H.I.E.L.D. Hill uses her LMD, which she uses in order to escape a group of alien shapeshifters known as Skrulls.
 Human Fly - The third Big Man used a bunch of Human Fly LMDs to attack Spider-Man and J. Jonah Jameson. They were defeated when J. Jonah Jameson used a remote to hack into the Spider-Slayer replicas.
 Iron Man – LMDs of Iron Man, Tony Stark, were used as a tactical or hazardous situations that pose a danger to his life. In a 1969 storyline that ran in Iron Man #11-12, his archenemy, the Mandarin, discovers that he is secretly Iron Man. Tony has an LMD of himself built in order to trick the Mandarin into believing that Iron Man is actually someone else. Stark subsequently secures the LMD in a vault which gains sentience, and believes in being the real Tony Stark. Stark LMDs would reappear in subsequent storylines featuring Iron Man.
 Joanie – In a 2013 storyline in Avengers A.I., a Life Model Decoy is created by the terrorist weapons maker A.I.M. to infiltrate the youth culture in the 1970s. She later becomes an ally of Dimitrios.
 Master Matrix – An sentient super Life Model Decoy created by Richard and Mary Parker to control the other LMDs. When he tried to replace all humans with LMDs, he's stopped by Spider-Man and Deadpool and being convinced into becoming a superhero.
 Nightshade – An LMD of this character appears in a 2012 storyline in Villains for Hire.
 Thunderbolt Ross – In a 2009 storyline in The Incredible Hulk, a Life Model Decoy of General Thaddeus "Thunderbolt" Ross is revealed to have been created to cover up his transformations into Red Hulk.
 Valentina Rychenko – An LMD of Valentina Rychenko appears in the 2001 "Rage" storyline in X-Force.
 Glenn Talbot – During the 2010 "World War Hulks" storyline, a Life Model Decoy of the Glenn Talbot is revealed to have been programmed to believe that it is the real Glenn Talbot brought back from death. It is destroyed when Red Hulk tears its head off its body.
 Thor – An LMD of the Asgardian God of Thunder appears in a 1976 Avengers storyline.

Other versions
In the alternate timeline of the "Heroes Reborn" storyline, Captain America is brainwashed into believing that he is a civilian living in the suburbs. As part of this ruse, his wife and son are LMDs assigned to protect him. Nick Fury also used a Captain America LMD during secret missions.

The android protagonists from the 2005 miniseries Livewires are built using LMD technology and Mannite technology. The main antagonists of the series are revealed to be rogue Nick Fury LMDs as well.

Doctor Doom uses his own version of an LMD known as a Doombot.

In other media

Television
 Life Model Decoy models appears in The Avengers: Earth's Mightiest Heroes.
 A Life Model Decoy of Nick Fury appears in Iron Man: Armored Adventures episode "Extremis". 
 Life Model Decoys appear in the Ultimate Spider-Man. These versions can holographically project a person's exact appearance, exhibit exceptional strength, and can roughly duplicate the powers of whoever they impersonate.
 Life Model Decoys appear in Avengers Assemble.
 Life Model Decoys appear Agents of S.H.I.E.L.D. These versions were inspired by the Koenig siblings, though the project remained dormant until scientist and inventor Holden Radcliffe revived it in the present after he turned his A.I. assistant AIDA into an LMD, who went on to create more. Additionally, LMDs controlled by Anton Ivanov appear in the fourth and fifth seasons while the seventh season introduces a Phil Coulson LMD enhanced with Chronicom technology.

Film
Life Model Decoys appear in Nick Fury: Agent of S.H.I.E.L.D.

Video games
 LMDs appear in Spider-Man: Friend or Foe.
 LMDs of Nick Fury appear in Marvel: Ultimate Alliance 2.
 LMDs appear in Disney Infinity 2.0 as part of Nick Fury's special ability.
 LMDs appear in Marvel Contest of Champions, as part of Nick Fury's signature ability.

References

External links
 Life Model Decoy at Marvel Wiki
 Life Model Decoy at Comic Vine
 Nick Fury's Life Model Decoy at Marvel Appendix

Characters created by Jack Kirby
Characters created by Stan Lee
Fictional robots
Marvel Comics characters who can move at superhuman speeds
Marvel Comics characters with superhuman strength
Marvel Comics robots
Nick Fury
S.H.I.E.L.D.